John Allan Jones (born January 14, 1938) is an American singer and actor.

Jones is primarily a straight-pop singer (even when he recorded contemporary material) whose forays into jazz are mostly of the big-band/swing variety. He has won two Grammy Awards.

Jones continues to perform concerts around the world and remains popular in Las Vegas. His recordings include "Lollipops and Roses" (1962 Grammy Award, Best Pop Male Performance), "Wives and Lovers" (1964 Grammy Award, Best Pop Male Performance), "The Race Is On", "The Impossible Dream", "Call Me Irresponsible", and "The Love Boat Theme". He also sang the opening theme tune for the 1968 film Anzio ("This World Is Yours").

Musical career

Early years and Capitol Records
Jones was born in Hollywood on the night his father  Allan Jones recorded his signature song "The Donkey Serenade", resulting in the younger Jones' assertion that he was "practically born in a trunk."  He attended University High School in West Los Angeles and studied drama and singing.

His first professional break was with his father, who was performing at the Thunderbird Hotel and Casino in Las Vegas.  He recorded several demos for songwriter Don Raye, attracting attention from the music industry.  In 1959 Jones was signed to Capitol Records and released the album This Love of Mine and a few singles.  One track from that album was titled, prophetically, "This Could Be the Start of Something Big".

Kapp years
While performing at a San Francisco nightclub, Jones was heard by Pete King, a producer and artist for Kapp Records, who quickly signed him to the label. In August 1961, he recorded the ballad "Lollipops and Roses", which became a hit the following year.  Jones' biggest pop hit was "Wives and Lovers", written by Burt Bacharach and Hal David.

During the Kapp years, Jones recorded nearly twenty albums, including Shall We Dance, This Was My Love, She Loves Me, Call Me Irresponsible, Bewitched, Wives and Lovers, Dear Heart, Where Love Has Gone, The Jack Jones Christmas Album, My Kind of Town, The Impossible Dream, The In Crowd, Jack Jones Sings, Lady, Our Song, and  I've Got a Lot of Living to Do!

Jones was an anomaly in the 1960s pop scene, eschewing rock-and-roll trends and opting for the big band sound, lush romantic ballads, and the Great American Songbook, although sometimes he recorded something more pop-, country-, or bossa nova-oriented.

For example, one of his biggest hits was "The Race Is On" by country musician George Jones (no relation).  Besides the choice of material, he worked with such arrangers as Billy May, Nelson Riddle, Marty Paich, Shorty Rogers, Jack Elliott, Ralph Carmichael, Bob Florence, and Don Costa.

RCA Victor and MGM years
Jones moved from Kapp (London Records in the UK) to RCA Victor in 1967. His first album for the label was Without Her. The following releases If You Ever Leave Me, L.A. Break Down, and Where Is Love were in roughly the same style of the Kapp records, but with a somewhat more contemporary vocal styling. After A Jack Jones Christmas, he changed his musical direction and appearance from the smooth club entertainer of the 1960s Las Vegas scene to the long-haired singer of the early 1970s.

A Time for Us (1970) was one of the albums which marked his transition toward a more middle-of-the-road sound. He began recording more contemporary material, including covers of such well-known songwriters as Randy Newman, Harry Nilsson, Carole King, Paul Williams, Richard Carpenter, Gordon Lightfoot, and Gilbert O'Sullivan.

The album Bread Winners (1972) was a tribute to the band Bread, with eight songs written by David Gates and two by Jimmy Griffin and Robb Royer. Two more albums from this period were dedicated to two French songwriters: Jack Jones Sings Michel Legrand (to Michel Legrand, 1971) and Write Me a Love Song, Charlie, featuring songs by Charles Aznavour (1974).

The Full Life (1977) was produced by Jones and Bruce Johnston of The Beach Boys; on this album, Jones recorded the Beach Boys classics "God Only Knows" and "Disney Girls". His last LP for RCA was With One More Look at You (1977), which includes a rendition of the Little Feat hit "Dixie Chicken"; this performance later resurfaced on Golden Throats 2: More Celebrity Rock Oddities. In 1979 he moved to MGM Records, recording the album Nobody Does It Better, which featured a disco version of "The Love Boat", the opening theme from the TV series of the same name, and his Grammy winner "Wives and Lovers". His second (and, due to its subsequent closure, his last) MGM album, Don't Stop Now, featured duets with Maureen McGovern.

Recent work
Since 1980 he has recorded few albums and now performs in various concert arenas and occasionally appears on the supper-club circuit.  He released the album Live at the London Palladium in 1995, recorded in London on the Emporio label. Jones has received recognition in Japan, where many of his earlier records were released on CD. In 1982 he recorded an album for Applause Records, covering songs by The Beatles, Billy Joel, and Eagles.

Jones released I Am a Singer in 1987 for USA Records, and in 1992 he recorded The Gershwin Album for Sony Music, with songs written by George Gershwin and Ira Gershwin. In 1997 came New Jack Swing (Honest Entertainment), with big-band treatments of old standards and assorted pop/rock songs. 1999 saw the release of Jack Jones Paints a Tribute to Tony Bennett (Honest Entertainment), which was nominated for Grammy Awards for Best Traditional Pop Vocal Performance and Record of the Year. In March 2008 Jones celebrated his 70th birthday and a half-century in show business with a concert at the McCallum Theatre in Palm Springs. Guests included Patti Austin, Alan Bergman, and Marilyn Bergman. In 2010 he recorded an album focusing on the Bergmans' work called Love Makes the Changes. He also released an album featuring new recordings of some of his original hits, titled Love Ballad. In 2015 Jones released Seriously Frank (Celebrating the 100th Birthday of Frank Sinatra), with an orchestra arranged and conducted by Patrick Williams, with Dave Grusin on piano. The release was followed by a tour with dates in Los Angeles and the United Kingdom in 2016. Jones commenced his 80th Birthday Celebration Tour in 2018.

Film, television and theatre
Jones made his film debut in Juke Box Rhythm (1959) playing Riff Manton, a young singer who is involved romantically with a princess (Jo Morrow). He sings three songs in the film. Jones acted in such minor films as The Comeback (1978), Condominium (1980), and Cruise of the Gods (2002). He had a humorous cameo in the film parody Airplane II: The Sequel (1982); as Robert Hays' character avoids searchlights while escaping captivity, the beams become a spotlight on Jones, performing a verse from The Love Boat theme.

He became a staple on 1960s and 1970s variety shows, performing on The Dinah Shore Chevy Show, The Ed Sullivan Show, The Andy Williams Show, The Dick Cavett Show, The Hollywood Palace, The Smothers Brothers Comedy Hour, The Carol Burnett Show, The Jerry Lewis Show, American Bandstand, This is Tom Jones, The Dean Martin Show, The Judy Garland Show, Playboy After Dark, The Jack Benny Program, The Steve Allen Show, and The Morecambe and Wise Show in Britain. He twice hosted NBC's top-rated rock and roll series Hullabaloo, and was featured in two prime-time specials, Jack Jones on the Move (1966) and The Jack Jones Special (1974). He also appeared on the Password (American game show) TV game show with Carol Lynley in 1964 and multiple times with Joan Fontaine in 1967.

He provided the vocals to the theme song of Funny Face, "The Kind of Girl She Is". When the show returned as The Sandy Duncan Show, he was replaced by a chorus of unknown men and women. He also guest-starred in the 1960s series The Rat Patrol (season 2, episode 8, "The Do-Re-Mi Raid", where he performed "That Tiny World" in the role of PFC Roberts, a POW being held by the Germans), Police Woman, McMillan & Wife, The Hardy Boys/Nancy Drew Mysteries, $weepstake$, Match Game, and Night Court.  He played himself in the episode "The Vegas Show" of It's a Living.  Jones sang the opening theme for the television series The Love Boat from 1977 through 1985, and also made several guest appearances on the show, including one with his father Allan.

He promoted the Chrysler New Yorker automobile in the mid-1970s with the "It's the Talk of the Town" ad campaign.  On 30th October, 1972 he appeared as a guest singer at the London Palladium in front of Her Majesty Queen Elizabeth the Queen Mother.

In 1990, Jones recorded "Three Coins in the Fountain", which was used in the film Coins in the Fountain that year. He also appeared in the Chris Elliot television show Get a Life on Fox.

In the 2000s-2010s, Jones has been active in musical theater, appearing in Guys and Dolls, South Pacific, and others. During this period he embarked upon a critically acclaimed national tour performing Don Quixote in Man of La Mancha. He also performed a song in an episode of Phineas and Ferb.

In 2013, he appeared as himself as the nightclub singer in the film American Hustle. In 2014, he provided the voice of the frog, and sang several of the songs, including the theme song, for the Cartoon Network miniseries Over the Garden Wall.

Honors
Jones is a two-time Grammy award winner.

In 2003, a Golden Palm Star on the Palm Springs, California, Walk of Stars was dedicated to Jones.

Personal life
Jones is the son of actor and singer Allan Jones and actress Irene Hervey. He has been married six times.  In the second half of the 1960s, Jones had a well-publicized relationship with actress Jill St. John, and the two were briefly married. In the early 1970s, Jones married Gretchen Roberts. Subsequently, he was linked romantically to Susan George. From 1976 to 1982, he was married to Kathy Simmons. From 1982 to 2005, he was married to British-born Kim Ely, and they had a daughter, Nicole (born in 1991). Jones has another daughter, Crystal Thomas, from a former marriage to Lee Fuller. He lives with wife Eleonora in Indian Wells, California.

Discography

 This Love of Mine (Capitol, 1959)
 Shall We Dance (Kapp, 1961)
 Lollipops and Roses (Kapp, 1961)
 Gift of Love (Kapp, 1962)
 I've Got a Lot of Livin' to Do! (Kapp, 1962)
 Call Me Irresponsible (Kapp, 1963)
 Bewitched (Kapp, 1963)
 Wives and Lovers (Kapp, 1963)
 In Love (Capitol, 1964)
 The Jack Jones Christmas Album (Kapp, 1964)
 Where Love Has Gone (Kapp, 1964)
 She Loves Me (Kapp, 1964)
 Dear Heart (Kapp, 1965)
 My Kind of Town (London, 1965)
 There's Love & There's Love & There's Love (Kapp, 1965)
 Songs of Love (London, 1965)
 Jack Jones (Mocambo, 1965)
 For the In Crowd (Kapp, 1965)
 Jack Jones Sings (Kapp, 1966)
 The Impossible Dream (Kapp, 1966)
 We'll Be Together Again (Sears, 1966)
 Our Song (Kapp, 1967)
 Lady (Kapp, 1967)
 Canciones Romanticas (Music Hall, 1967)
 Without Her (RCA Victor 1967)
 Where Is Love? (RCA Victor, 1968)
 If You Ever Leave Me (RCA Victor, 1968)
 What the World Needs Now Is Love! (Kapp, 1968)
 Curtain Time (Kapp, 1968)
 The Bliss of Mrs. Blossom (RCA, 1968)
 L. A. Break Down (RCA Victor, 1969)
 A Jack Jones Christmas (RCA, 1969)
 Love Story (RCA Victor, 1969)
 A Time for Us (RCA 1969)
 In Person at the Sands Las Vegas (RCA Victor, 1970)
 Jack Jones Sings Michel Legrand (RCA Victor, 1971)
 Bread Winners (RCA Victor, 1972)
 A Song for You (RCA Victor, 1972)
 Jack Jones in Hollywood (MCA, 1972)
 Together (RCA Victor, 1973)
 Christmas with Jack Jones (RCA Camden, 1973)
 Harbour (RCA Victor, 1974)
 What I Did for Love (RCA Victor, 1975)
 Write Me a Love Song, Charlie (RCA Victor, 1975)
 With One More Look at You (RCA Victor, 1977)
 The Full Life (RCA Victor, 1977)
 Nobody Does It Better (MGM, 1979)
 Don't Stop Now (MGM, 1980)
 I've Been Here All the Time (Polydor, 1980)
 Jack Jones (Applause, 1982)
 Fire & Rain (President, 1985)
 I Am a Singer (USA Music, 1984)
 The Gershwin Album (Columbia, 1992)
 Chase the Rainbows (Object 1992)
 Live at the Sands (LaserLight, 1993)
 The Mood Is Love (Quicksilver, 1993)
 New Jack Swing (Linn, 1997)
 White Christmas (MCA, 1998)
 Jack Jones Paints a Tribute to Tony Bennett (Honest, 1998)
 The Wind Beneath My Wings (Castle Pulse, 2002)

Singles

Awards

References

External links
 
 
 Jack Jones endorsed website
 Interview with Jones
 Jack Jones Interview NAMM Oral History Library (1994)

1938 births
20th-century American male actors
20th-century American singers
21st-century American male actors
21st-century American singers
American crooners
American male film actors
American male musical theatre actors
American male pop singers
American male television actors
American male voice actors
Capitol Records artists
Grammy Award winners
Kapp Records artists
Living people
Male actors from Los Angeles
MGM Records artists
American people of Welsh descent
People from Indian Wells, California
RCA Victor artists
Singers from Los Angeles
Traditional pop music singers
University High School (Los Angeles) alumni
20th-century American male singers
21st-century American male singers
United Service Organizations entertainers